Augasma aeratella is a moth of the family Coleophoridae. It is found in most of Europe (except most Fennoscandia and parts of the Balkan Peninsula). The habitat consists of open landscapes of forest-steppe and steppe biotopes.

The wingspan is 9–10 mm. Adults are on wing from June to July in one generation per year.

The larva live in fusiform galls on the stems of Polygonum aviculare, Polygonum arenarium and Polygonum lapathifolium. They can be found from late June to mid-August.

References

Coleophoridae
Moths of Europe
Moths of Asia
Moths described in 1839